S3W may refer to:

Saw III, the sequel to the Saw horror movie
S3W reactor, a type of naval reactor used by the United States Navy